New Old  (New old ou les chroniques du temps présent), is a French film directed by Pierre Clémenti, released in 1979. It is the second part of an experimental trilogy comprising 'Visa De Censure No.X', 'Livre De Famille' and 'Anima Mundi'. The Village Voice wrote, "Clémenti's New Old (1979—subtitled Chronicles of the Present Times) flows together footage from more than a decade of his wandering between scenes, sets, and drugs, an accelerated world tour through various iterations of the "counterculture." There are fragments of Clémenti on film and stage, a pilgrimage to Warhol's New York and scrambled jamming . . . until the soundtrack tightens up guttural punk guitars from Les Lou's."

Details
 Format : Colour - Mono - 16 mm

Starring
 Pierre Clémenti
 Viva
 Nadine Hermand
 Michelle Bernet
 Amin Reyburn
 Nadine Alkan
 Yves Harrisson
 Jean-Pierre Mouleyre
 Jamila
 Tania

References

External links
 

French drama films
1979 films
1970s French-language films
1970s English-language films
1970s French films